The Kuwait Emir Cup is the premier cup competition involving teams from the Kuwaiti Premier League and the Kuwaiti Division One league.

The 2014–15 edition was the 52nd to be held.

Kuwait Emir Cup seasons
2014–15 in Kuwaiti football
2014–15 domestic association football cups